Putative helicase MOV-10 is an enzyme that in humans is encoded by the MOV10 gene. Stability of MOV10 protein is controlled via DCAF12 ubiquitin ligase.

References

Further reading